Vedam Jaishankar is an experienced cricket correspondent with a career spanning two decades during which he has travelled extensively and covered cricketing in six continents across the globe. Cricket has been an abiding passion with him and he has played school college and club cricket with a number of well known cricketers. He coached for a few years in the Brijesh Patel Cricket Academy before the demands of journalism made him give up coaching. After a stint with the Deccan Herald he moved to The Indian Express where he was the principal cricket correspondent for many years. He has occasionally done Television and Radio commentary of the game. Jaishankar was the office bearer of the Sports Writers Association of Bangalore and its parent body Sports Journalist Federation of India. He also served in the Board of Control for Cricket in India's Accreditation Committee in two World Cup tournaments.

Jaishankar is the founder managing editor of Bangalore Bias, an English language afternoon paper in Bangalore after a long stint with The New Indian Express as its main cricket writer. He authored the best-seller book, Rahul Dravid, a Biography and Casting A Spell, The Story of a Cricket. The Dravid biography was also officially translated into three languages. A veteran of several World Cups, he last covered the 2003 edition in South Africa, for Vijay Times that he helped launch. Jaishankar writes for SPIN, a British cricket magazine besides a number of Indian publications.

References

Indian cricket commentators
Living people
Indian male journalists
Journalists from Karnataka
Year of birth missing (living people)